Baraba or Baraba Tatar, is spoken by at least 8,000 Baraba Tatars in Siberia. It is a dialect of Siberian Tatar language. While middle aged individuals and the young generation speak Russian and Volga-Ural Tatar languages, Baraba dialect is used by the older generation.

History 
The Arabic script has been historically used to write the language. The latin script was adopted in 1928 but was replaced with the Cyrillic script in 1938. While standard Volga Tatar is widely taught in local schools, Baraba Tatar is not.

Geographic distribution
Baraba Tatar is spoken mainly in the Novosibirsk Oblast in Russia.  Standard Volga–Ural Tatar is taught at local Tatar schools.

Sounds

Consonants

Sounds in parentheses appear only in loan words.
The sounds  and  appear in free variation.

Vowels

See also
 Siberian Tatar language

References

Siberian Tatars
Tatar language

External links
  Atlas of Tatar dialects